Wierna Małogoszcz is a Polish football club from Małogoszcz. They play in the fifth-tier IV liga.

Honours & Achievements

Domestic
 1/16 Polish Cup:
 (1): 2005/06

References

External links 
  (Polish)
 Wierna Małogoszcz at the 90minut.pl website (Polish)

Association football clubs established in 1978
1978 establishments in Poland
Jędrzejów County
Football clubs in Świętokrzyskie Voivodeship